Major Wilfred Edwards VC (16 February 1893 – 4 January 1972) was an English recipient of the Victoria Cross, the highest and most prestigious award for gallantry in the face of the enemy by British and Commonwealth forces.

Edwards was born on 16 February 1893. He was 24 years old, and a private in the 7th Battalion, The King's Own Yorkshire Light Infantry, British Army during the First World War, and was awarded the VC for his actions on 16 August 1917 at Langemarck, Belgium:

Edwards was commissioned a second lieutenant in December 1917 and was demobilised in June 1919. He re-enlisted in the army when World War II broke out and rose to the rank of major.

He died in January 1972. His medals are displayed in the Kings Own Yorkshire Light Infantry Museum, Doncaster, England.

References

Monuments to Courage (David Harvey, 1999)
The Register of the Victoria Cross (This England, 1997)
VCs of the First World War - Passchendaele 1917 (Stephen Snelling, 1998)

External links
Location of grave and VC medal (West Yorkshire)

1893 births
1972 deaths
Burials in West Yorkshire
Military personnel from Norwich
King's Own Yorkshire Light Infantry officers
British World War I recipients of the Victoria Cross
British Army personnel of World War I
Royal Army Ordnance Corps officers
British Army personnel of World War II
British Army recipients of the Victoria Cross
King's Own Yorkshire Light Infantry soldiers